John Grainger was an Irish cleric and antiquarian.

John Grainger or Granger may also refer to:

 John Harry Grainger, architect and civil engineer
 John Grainger (footballer, born 1912), English professional footballer
 John Grainger (footballer, born 1924), English professional footballer
 John Grainger (politician) (1803–1872), real estate investor and member of the South Australian Legislative Council
 John Granger, speaker and writer
 John Granger (footballer), Scottish footballer

See also
Jack Grainger (disambiguation)